Tales from the Dead is a 2007 horror film, written and directed by Jason Cuadrado. The film is an anthology of four ghost stories as told by Tamika, a strange young girl with the ability to communicate with the dead. Each tale deals with loss, pain and vengeance as the spirits who tell them attempt to put things right in the world of the living.

The film is notable for being a Japanese horror film shot entirely in Los Angeles, in Japanese with local Japanese talent. Writer/director Jason Cuadrado did not know any Japanese at the time of filming.

Plot summary
The film follows a family, newly reunited with their estranged son, faces the remnants of the bad marriage, and evil intentions, of their home's previous owners. An old accountant, trying to set his "books" straight after a life of working for a criminal gang, takes his revenge on the man who wouldn't let him. A businessman, hungering for success and material opulence, finds that time is the only truly scarce resource—and the only one genuinely valuable. Lastly, a surprise ending for Shoko, a lady of leisure, who has a deadly definition of divorce, and meets young Tamika on the wrong dark and foggy road.

Cast

"Home Sweet Home"
Leni Ito as Tamika
Kiyoko Kamei as Manami
Eiji Inoue as Shiro
Masami Teramoto as Kyoko
Daisuke Tomita as Kenji
Masami Kosaka as Toshiro
Eriko Yamaguchi as Akiko

"The Dirty Business of Time"
Yutaka Takeuchi as Yoshi
Kazumi Zatkin as Mai
Mark Ofuji as Ebisu
Arthur Shinomia as Hiroshi
Satomi Okuno as Mika
Hiro Saito as Sato

"Chalk"
Toshiya Agata as Detective Minehiro
Sachiko Hayashi as Detective Himiko
Hidetoshi Imura as Seiji
Daisuke Suzuki as Sheriff Harada
Mari Endo as Kaori
Keiichiro Hirayama as Takashi

"Shoko the Widow"
Nikki Takei as Shoko
Leni Ito as Tamika
Hiro Abe as Jiro
Yumi Mizui as Keiko
Miley Yamamoto as Gin
Makiko Konishi as Mari
Masayuki Yonezawa as Kiyoshi
Natalie Okamoto as Michi
Yoi Tanabe as Reika
Kie Ito as Ayame

References

External links
Official Tales from the Dead website

2000 films
2007 horror films
2007 films
American supernatural horror films
Asian-American horror films
2000s American films